The women's heptathlon competition of the athletics events at the 2015 Pan American Games will take place between the 24 and 25 of July at the CIBC Pan Am and Parapan Am Athletics Stadium. The defending Pan American Games champion is Lucimara da Silva from Brazil.

Records
Prior to this competition, the existing world and Pan American Games records were as follows:

Qualification

Each National Olympic Committee (NOC) was able to enter up to two entrants providing they had met the minimum standard (4995) in the qualifying period (January 1, 2014 to June 28, 2015).

Schedule

Results
All times shown are in seconds.

100 m hurdles

High jump

Shot put

200 metres

Long jump

Javelin throw

800 metres

Final standings

References

Athletics at the 2015 Pan American Games
2015
2015 in women's athletics